Scharllette Alexandra Allen Moses (born September 18, 1991) is a Nicaraguan beauty pageant titleholder from Bluefields who became the first woman of Afro-Nicaraguan background to win the title of Miss Nicaragua and represent her country in the 2010 Miss Universe pageant.

Miss Nicaragua

Allen was also on the list of those named Personalities of the Year in her home country, announced in the national and local media on December 31, 2010.

Miss Universe 2010
As the official representative of her country to the 2010 Miss Universe pageant broadcast live from Las Vegas, Nevada on August 23, Allen participated as one of the 83 delegates who vied for the crown of eventual winner, Ximena Navarrete of Mexico.

References

External links
Official Miss Nicaragua website

1991 births
Living people
People from Bluefields
Miss Nicaragua winners
Miss Universe 2010 contestants